The Shire of Gooburrum was a local government area to the north and west of the regional city of Bundaberg, Australia.

History
Kolan Division was established on 11 November 1879 as one of the original divisions under the Divisional Boards Act 1879. On 28 January 1886, the region north of the Burnett River was excised from Kolan Division to create a separate Gooburrum Division.

With the passage of the Local Authorities Act 1902, Gooburrum Division became the Shire of Gooburrum on 31 March 1903. The Shire's offices were located in 186 Bourbong Street, Bundaberg, adjacent to Bundaberg City's offices.

In 1909, the Gooburrum Shire had an area of 512 square miles, a population of 4340, and 708 ratepayers. The value of the shire was estimated at £257,752, and the Government indebtedness totals £13,761.

On 21 November 1991, the Electoral and Administrative Review Commission, created two years earlier, produced its second report, and recommended that local government boundaries in the Bundaberg area be rationalised. The Local Government (Bundaberg and Burnett) Regulation 1993 was gazetted on 17 December 1993, and on 30 March 1994, the Shire of Goolburrum was abolished and amalgamated with Shire of Woongarra to form the Shire of Burnett.

A tribute to the Shire of Gooburrum can be found on the ground floor of Fairymead House, Bundaberg Botanic Gardens in the museum section of the home.

Towns and localities
 Abbotsford
 Avondale
 Bucca
 Bullyard
 Fairymead
 Gooburrum
 Littabella
 Meadowvale
 Miara
 Moore Park
 Moorland
 Oakwood
 Sharon
 South Kolan
 Watalgan
 Waterloo
 Welcome Creek
 Winfield
 Yandaran

Chairmen
 1927: A. J. Gibson

Population

References

External links
 Local Government (Bundaberg and Burnett) Regulation 1993

Former local government areas of Queensland
1886 establishments in Australia
1994 disestablishments in Australia